In Greek mythology, Ephyra (Ancient Greek: Εφυρα) or Ephyre may refer to two different deities:

 Ephyra, one of the 3,000 Oceanids, water-nymph daughters of the Titans Oceanus and his sister-wife Tethys. Otherwise, she was called the daughter or wife of the Titan Epimetheus. Ephyra was the first to dwell in the land of Ephyrae, which was later called Corinth. In some accounts, her father was called Myrmex. Ephyra was sometimes attributed to be the mother of Aeetes by Helios.
 Ephyre, one of the 50 Nereids, sea-nymph daughters of the "Old Man of the Sea" Nereus and the Oceanid Doris. She was in the train of Cyrene along with her sister Opis, Deiopea and Arethusa. This Ephyra may be the same to the above Oceanid.

Notes

References 

 Fowler, Robert L., Early Greek Mythography. Volume 2: Commentary. Oxford University Press. 2013.
Gaius Julius Hyginus, Fabulae from The Myths of Hyginus translated and edited by Mary Grant. University of Kansas Publications in Humanistic Studies. Online version at the Topos Text Project.
 Pausanias, Description of Greece with an English Translation by W.H.S. Jones, Litt.D., and H.A. Ormerod, M.A., in 4 Volumes. Cambridge, MA, Harvard University Press; London, William Heinemann Ltd. 1918. . Online version at the Perseus Digital Library
 Pausanias, Graeciae Descriptio. 3 vols. Leipzig, Teubner. 1903.  Greek text available at the Perseus Digital Library.
 Publius Vergilius Maro, Bucolics, Aeneid, and Georgics of Vergil. J. B. Greenough. Boston. Ginn & Co. 1900. Online version at the Perseus Digital Library.

Oceanids
Nereids